Richard Gorges may refer to:
 Richard Gorges (1662–1728), Anglo-Irish politician
 Richard Gorges (Augher MP) (1709–1778), Anglo-Irish politician
 Richard Gorges (Leominster MP) (c.1730–1780)
 Richard William Howard Gorges (c.1876–1944) Anglo-Irish soldier and criminal
 Sir Richard Gorges-Meredyth, 1st Baronet (born Richard Gorges, 1735–1821), Anglo-Irish politician and baronet

See also
 Richard Georges, poet laureate of the British Virgin Islands